HD 39225, also known as HR 2028, is a variable star in the northern constellation Auriga, located around 620 light years away from the Sun. It is visible to the naked eye as a faint, red-hued star with an apparent visual magnitude of around 6.04. This is a suspected runaway star that is moving away from the Sun with a heliocentric radial velocity of 98 km/s. 

The suffix notation indicates an underabundance of iron in the stellar atmosphere compared to similar stars of its class. It is suspected of varying in brightness between magnitudes 5.82 and 6.07. Having exhausted the hydrogen at its core, it has expanded to around 43 times the Sun's radius. It shines with a luminosity approximately 398.6 times that of the Sun and has a surface temperature of 3,934 K.

References

M-type giants
Suspected variables
Auriga (constellation)
Durchmusterung objects
039225
027778
2028